Abdel Qader El-Touni (24 May 1924 – 29 November 2005) was an Egyptian weightlifter. He competed at the 1952 Summer Olympics and the 1960 Summer Olympics.

References

1924 births
2005 deaths
Egyptian male weightlifters
Olympic weightlifters of Egypt
Weightlifters at the 1952 Summer Olympics
Weightlifters at the 1960 Summer Olympics
Sportspeople from Cairo
20th-century Egyptian people